Est (stylized as est) Cola is a cola soft drink from Thailand, manufactured by Sermsuk Public Company Limited. It was launched on 2 November 2012. It was created following the termination of the company's contract with PepsiCo, for whom it had bottled and distributed Pepsi in Thailand since 1952.

Variants
 est Cola
 est Sugar Free Cola
 est Play: Fruit-flavored soft drink. Available in orange, cream soda, strawberry, grape berry, lychee-pear and lemon-lime (also known as est Clear) varieties.

References 

Cola brands
Lemon-lime sodas
Fruit sodas
Thai drink brands